John Donelson (1718–1785) was an American frontiersman, ironmaster, politician, city planner, and explorer. After founding and operating what became Washington Iron Furnace in Franklin County, Virginia for several years, he moved with his family to Middle Tennessee which was on the developing frontier.

There, together with James Robertson, Donelson co-founded the frontier settlement of Fort Nashborough. This later developed as the city of Nashville, Tennessee.

Donelson and his wife Rachel had eleven children, four of them girls. Their tenth, daughter Rachel,
married Andrew Jackson who was elected United States president in 1828.

Career
Donelson served in the Virginia House of Burgesses. From about 1770 to 1779, he operated the Washington Iron Furnace at Rocky Mount, Franklin County, Virginia.

He next moved to the Watauga settlements on the Holston and Watauga rivers in Washington District, North Carolina. They came into conflict with the Overhill Cherokee on the far side of the Appalachians. Because of armed conflict and flooding in his settlement, Donelson temporarily moved his family to safer areas in Kentucky. 

Along with James Robertson who traveled the overland route, Donelson and a large number of pioneers traveled down the Tennessee and other rivers in excess of 1,000 miles to Middle Tennessee, where they co-founded Fort Nashborough, in 1780. This eventually developed as the city of Nashville, Tennessee. A collection of his diaries are kept in Cleveland Hall, in Nashville.

Personal life
Donelson married Rachel (née Stockley) (1730–1801) in 1744. They had eleven children, including four daughters who married well and had descendants who became prominent military men and politicians.

Youngest daughter Rachel first married Lewis Robards in 1787; she later married Andrew Jackson of Tennessee. He was elected president of the United States in 1828. She died in December of that year, shortly before he was inaugurated in January 1829.

Daughter Mary Donelson married Captain John Caffery, and two of their descendants served in national political office.

Family political legacy
Several of John and Rachel's descendants were elected to political office. Their great-grandson, Donelson Caffery II (1835–1906), served one term as a Louisiana State Senator and two terms as a U.S. Senator from Louisiana. He was elected to that office by the state legislature, as was customary at the time. In 1896 he was the first nominee for president of the "Democratic National Party" but declined the nomination. In 1900, he was nominated to head the presidential ticket of the "National Party" but declined that nomination as well.

The Donelsons' great-great-great grandson, attorney Patrick Thomson Caffery (1932–2013), served one term as a Louisiana State Representative (1964–1968), and two terms as a United States Representative from Louisiana's 3rd congressional district (1969–1973). He retired from Congress to resume the practice of law.

Death and legacy
Donelson was shot and killed in 1785 by an unknown person on the banks of the Barren River. He was en route to Mansker's Station after a business trip.

Donelson, Tennessee was named in his honor.

More about descendants
Mary Donelson, daughter of Captain John Donelson III and Mary Purnell. The niece of Rachel Donelson Jackson, Mary married General John Coffee
Andrew Jackson Donelson, {grandson of John Donelson and brother to Daniel Smith Donelson)
General Daniel Smith Donelson, CSA {grandson of John Donelson and nephew of Andrew Jackson)
Colonel John Donelson Martin, CSA (grandson of John Donelson}
Judge John Donelson Martin Sr. (grandson of Col John Donelson Martin and great-great-grandson of John Donelson}
 U.S. Senator Donelson Caffery II (great-grandson of John Donelson and son of Donelson Caffery I, agent of Andrew Jackson)
 U.S. Representative Patrick Caffery (son of Ralph Earl Caffery, grandson of U.S. Senator Donelson Caffery II and great-great-great grandson of John Donelson)
Captain John Caffery, (son-in-law of John Donelson, Agent of Andrew Jackson, Sheriff of Bedford County VA. His daughter Mary Caffery married Ralph Early, who painted Andrew Jackson's portrait and is buried at the Hermitage.)

See also
Cherokee–American wars
Sycamore Shoals

References

External links
City of Nashville biography
John Donelson Journal - Transcription and scan of journal about 1779 river journey.
John Donelson's "Journal of the Adventure" - in J.G.M. Ramsey's Annals of Tennessee to the End of the Eighteenth Century (1853).
 

1718 births
1785 deaths
Andrew Jackson
American city founders
People of Tennessee in the American Revolution
People from Nashville, Tennessee
House of Burgesses members
People of pre-statehood Tennessee
Andrew Jackson family
18th-century American politicians
American slave owners
North Carolina militiamen in the American Revolution
Deaths by firearm in Tennessee